Khelifa Bannani (born 9 June 1985) is a Tunisian football defender.

References

1985 births
Living people
Tunisian footballers
EGS Gafsa players
Association football defenders
Tunisian Ligue Professionnelle 1 players
Place of birth missing (living people)